Steven Pippin (born 1960 at Redhill, Surrey) is an English photographer and installation artist. Pippin works with converted or improvised photographic equipment and kinetic sculptures which are often based on physical models and are metaphors for social mechanisms.

Early life and education

Pippin's work shows a strong interest in the mechanical, which he has said stems from an early childhood memory of seeing his father surrounded by the wires and tubes of a television set he was repairing. He studied in Mechanical Engineering at Charles Keen College, Leicester; Foundation Art & Design at Loughborough College, Leicestershire; Fine Art Sculpture at Brighton Polytechnic and Fine Art Sculpture at Chelsea School of Art, London. 

and sculpture in London at the Chelsea School of Art. 

From the beginning of his career, his works focused on creating atmospheric photographs by converting every day object into provisional pin hole cameras.

Artistic career
Pippin's early work was based on converting furniture and everyday objects into makeshift pinhole cameras which he then used to take sympathetic photographs. Sympathetic photography, as seen through photographer Allan Sekula (1951-2013), is "ethico-political orientation of sensitivity, receptivity, or exposure to bodily vulnerability and suffering".

His work often involves a significant amount of planning to overcome the practical problems posed by the chosen object. Pippin typically has to plan and construct a significant amount of supporting equipment in order to achieve his pictures. Frequently the resulting photographs are distorted or otherwise compromised by the manner of their construction, but the imperfections are seen as an important characteristic of the image, giving a link back to the object which was used as a camera. The photographs are always shown alongside an image of the converted object, and for later works, much of the actual equipment used in the conversion along with supporting documentation.

In 1999, Pippin was short listed for the Turner Prize at the Tate Gallery in London. His entry was based on his artwork Laundromat Locomotion, in which he converted a row of 12 washing machines in a laundromat into a series of cameras triggered by trip wires, and then rode a horse through the laundromat to recreate Eadweard Muybridge’s The Horse in Motion (1878). Laundromat Locomotion was showcased in the New Work exhibition hosted by the San Francisco Museum of Modern Art in 1998.

Pippin's more recent work also includes kinetic sculptures, works in which movement is perceivable by the viewer.

Work Philosophy 
Pippin explained the philosophy behind his work The Window on the World to the Potsdam Institute for Climate Impact Research."In the purely traditional sense Photography (whose predecessor painting) allows for a privileged window onto the world, offering the viewer, via the two dimensional picture plane, an uninhibited scene of virtually anything from landscapes and cityscapes down to minute details and microscopic organisms in an attempt to take the minds eye on a journey, either away from themselves and their particular situation or perhaps deeper into self reflection on their current position (in front of the picture). This is the romantic notion of all images, to takeover or extract the mind of the viewer by slowly seducing them with an ever more enticing view into a world that they may never otherwise see or experience. However by offering the limited view of a closed window and brick wall, a relative visual cul-de-sac and an extremely uninteresting viewpoint, the idea of removing the viewer from reality is usurped and undermined by the concept imbedded in the particular manufacture of the image. This offers the mind the possibility of an endless, infinite and never ending view. An attempt to take the mind of the viewer away from the idea of a single fixed frame format point of view into a picture that has no definitive surface. Also the lack of a dramatic or absorbing image (like a waterfall or moonscape) forces the contemplation of the mind inwards on itself forcing a different approach and a different viewpoint via which it might be possible to re consider the particular open ended aspect that this particular photograph. Essentially the actual image becomes superficial, and is purely a conduit for accessing another plane of thought."

Footnotes

External links
Mr Pippin - Steven Pippin official site
Guardian special report (Oct 1999)
SFMOMA exhibition (1998)

1960 births
Living people
English sculptors
English male sculptors
Photographers from Surrey
20th-century British sculptors
21st-century sculptors
English contemporary artists